Tangin Dassouri is a city located in the Tanghin-Dassouri Department of Kadiogo Province in Burkina Faso.

In popular culture 

 The music video for Ivorian–Burkinabé singer Imilo Lechanceux's 2017 song "Une Minute au Village" ("One Minute in the Village") was shot in Tanghin-Dassouri.

References 

Populated places in the Centre Region (Burkina Faso)